Top o' the Morning is a 1949 American romantic comedy film directed by David Miller and starring Bing Crosby, Ann Blyth, and Barry Fitzgerald. Written by Edmund Beloin and Richard L. Breen, the film is about a singing insurance investigator who comes to Ireland to recover the stolen Blarney Stone—and romance the local policeman's daughter.

Plot

Cast

 Bing Crosby as Joe Mulqueen
 Ann Blyth as Conn McNaughton
 Barry Fitzgerald as Sergeant Briny McNaughton
 Hume Cronyn as Hughie Devine
 Eileen Crowe as Biddy O'Devlin
 John McIntire as Inspector Fallon 
 Tudor Owen as Cormac Gillespie 
 Jimmy Hunt as Pearse O'Neill 
 Morgan Farley as Edwin Livesley 
 John Eldredge as E. L. Larkin 
 John "Skins" Miller as Dowdler 
 John Costello as Village Gossip 
 Dick Ryan as Clark O'Ryan 
 Bernard Cauley as Boy 
 Paul Connelly as Boy

Reception
Bosley Crowther of The New York Times commented, inter alia: "All things being considered, especially the memorable success of Paramount’s “Welcome Stranger” and its incomparable “Going My Way,” it naturally stood to reason that Bing Crosby and Barry Fitzgerald would eventually drift together in another sentimental comedy... And all those band-wagon Hibernians who like to picture Ireland as a land of eloquent talk and superstitions, bright-eyed colleens and Mr. Fitzgeralds, plus a great lot of singing and dancing, should find it entirely to their taste... Mr. Crosby wends a happy and comfortable course through the whole incredible proceedings, taking complacently in stride the fitful abuse of Mr. Fitzgerald and the romantic rue of Ann Blyth...Likewise, Mr. Fitzgerald is deliciously humorous in his busy displays of self-importance and police authority. And of course, he is simply stunning when he comes within range of a pint of ale..."
 
Variety said: "Bing Crosby, after two lush Technicolored musicals, has been handed a light, frothy and more moderately budgeted picture by Paramount to cavort in, which should put him once more at the top of that studio’s breadwinning list...Under David Miller’s light-handed direction, Crosby and the rest of the cast fall right into the spirit of the story. Groaner, despite his having to play to a gal (Ann Blyth) who is so obviously younger, is socko. His easy way with a quip, combined with his fine crooning of some old Irish tunes and a couple of new ones, is solid showmanship."

Soundtrack
"Top o' the Morning" (Jimmy Van Heusen / Johnny Burke): sung three times by Bing Crosby
"When Irish Eyes Are Smiling": sung by Bing Crosby
"Kitty of Coleraine" (Traditional Irish Air - Edward Lysaght): sung by Bing Crosby
"The Donovans" (Alicia Adélaide Needham / Walter Kent / Francis Fahy): sung by Bing Crosby and group
"You're in Love with Someone" (Jimmy Van Heusen / Johnny Burke): sung by Bing Crosby, and again by Bing Crosby and Ann Blyth
"Oh, 'Tis Sweet to Think" (Thomas Moore): sung by Bing Crosby and Ann Blyth
"Believe Me, if All Those Endearing Young Charms"

Bing Crosby recorded four of the songs for Decca Records. They were all issued on a 10" LP titled "Top o' the Morning / Emperor Waltz". Crosby's songs were also included in the Bing's Hollywood series.

Radio adaptation
Lux Radio Theatre presented Top o' the Morning March 17, 1952. The one-hour episode featured Barry Fitzgerald, Dennis Day, and Ann Blyth.

References

External links
 

1949 films
Films directed by David Miller
Films scored by Robert Emmett Dolan
Films set in Ireland
1949 romantic comedy films
American romantic comedy films
American black-and-white films
Paramount Pictures films
1940s American films